The Auberge d'Italie was an auberge in Birgu, Malta. It was built in the sixteenth century to house knights of the Order of Saint John from the langue of Italy.

History

Auberge
The auberge was located in the northern part of Birgu, close to Fort St. Angelo and far from the collacchio where the other auberges were found. It was built between 1553 and 1554 to a design by Niccolò Bellavante, on the site of an earlier auberge. Part of the building was used as a naval hospital, and it also included a chapel dedicated to St. Catherine of Alexandria.

Adaptive reuse

The auberge remained in use until April 1571, when the Italian knights moved to a larger Auberge d'Italie in the new capital city Valletta. This auberge was later incorporated into the Grandmaster's Palace, and a third Auberge d'Italie was built in 1579. A Church of St. Catherine was also built adjacent to the third auberge.

In the 1900s or before, the building was the host of the Fabbrica di Mobiglia Carmelo Seychel Carpentiere. A photo by Richard Ellis is publicly available, portraying the full facade. Another photograph of the building was taken circa 1935, when part of the building was a residence.

Architecture and remains

Auberge d'Italie was included on the Antiquities List of 1925, together with the other auberges in Birgu. 

The building was severely damaged by aerial bombardment during World War II. The site was rebuilt as housing units between 1961 and 1963, and some features of the auberge were incorporated into the new buildings. These houses are regarded as being of a sub-standard nature.

Today, the only remains of the auberge are a quoin, a partially defaced coat of arms, the base of a balcony, and some mouldings on the façade. These remains were scheduled as a Grade 2 property on 2 December 2009, and they are also listed on the National Inventory of the Cultural Property of the Maltese Islands.

Further reading 
Story of the Italian Langue and the Auberge

References

External links 
National Inventory of the Cultural Property of the Maltese Islands

Palaces in Birgu
Buildings and structures completed in 1554
Buildings and structures in Malta destroyed during World War II
Limestone buildings in Malta
National Inventory of the Cultural Property of the Maltese Islands
Defunct hospitals in Malta
1554 establishments in Malta